Cosmo is the official mascot of Brigham Young University's (BYU) athletic teams. He can be seen at almost all sporting events, wearing the uniform of the team that is playing.  In the past, Cosmo's job was a volunteer position, and no scholarship or academic assistance was given. However, scholarships and other benefits are offered today. 
The mascot is expected to be involved in civic events and university functions.

Cosmo was named the Mascot "National Champion" in the SXM College's Twitter poll in April 2020.

History of Cosmo

Before the costume

Cosmo comes to life
On October 15, 1953, Cosmo made his first appearance in front of BYU fans.   Dwayne Stevenson, the pep chairman of BYU, bought the costume for $73 and persuaded his roommate Daniel T. Gallego to wear it and thus become the first Cosmo.  The name Cosmo derives from the word "cosmopolitan" and was chosen because BYU had recently been selected as a Cosmopolitan school.  Cosmo became immediately popular, and since Gallego many people have been Cosmo, including BYU president Ernest L. Wilkinson, who once put on the costume at a pep rally.  LaVell Edwards, the legendary football coach for the Cougars, wore the Cosmo costume during the final season basketball game against Utah in 1981 for the unveiling of that year's Cosmo, Brian Larney (In Dec. 1980 the Cougars beat SMU in the "Miracle Bowl" led by Jim McMahon in San Diego) (The Basketball team led by Danny Ainge went on to the NCAA Tourney and beat UCLA and then Notre Dame in the final seconds.)

Cosmo undergoes cosmetic surgery
On September 2, 1997, BYU's Athletic Media Relations announced that while hunting Red Tail Hawks (rival Utah's mascot) in Rock Canyon, Cosmo fell 100 feet.  Several students saw the fall, however, and called Utah Valley Search and Rescue, which performed emergency surgery on Cosmo.  This included reduction in head size, which allowed Cosmo more range in motion and the ability to perform more daring stunts.  Cosmo frequently does flips, walks on stilts, rides motorcycles, and performs slam dunks in order to please the crowd.  It was remarked once on ESPN that Cosmo was "probably the most athletic mascot in college basketball."

Cosmo today

Cosmo's workload of performances at more than 450 functions a year necessitates that there be more than one Cosmo at a 
time.  A team of people, Team Cosmo, helps him with his antics.  He drives around in the Cosmobile, a van retrofitted for Cosmo's active lifestyle, and also owns a go-cart.

In popular culture

Cosmo and the media
Recently, Cosmo has been the subject of a series of short films, "Cosmo Begins," and "Cosmo: Reloaded," which have been displayed between the third and fourth quarters at home football games. He also participated in the Capital One Mascot Bowl and was featured on several commercials that showed on national television.

Past Cosmos
Over 70 people have been Cosmo over the years.  Some of them include:
 Daniel T. Gallego, 1953–54
 Clive Moon, 1954–55
 Ray Pope, 1955–56
 Peggy Herron Mortensen, 1955–56
 Daniel T. Gallego, 1959–60
 Roy Spradley, 1960–61
 Buddy Youngreen, 1961–62
 John Bennion, 1971–72 
 Michael T. Dowling, 1976–77
 Jim Daly, 1977–78
 Dave Wright, 1982–83
 David Broach, 1987–88
 Paul Thorley, 1988–89
 Bret Pope, 1989–90 
 Michael Porter, 1990–91
 G. Craig Randall, 1990–92
 Richard Dee Lalliss, 1990–92
  Brent Hales, 1992–93 
 Gary R. Arbuckle Jr., 1993–94 
Cameron K. Mylroie, 1994-95 
 Aaron G. McGavock, 1999–2001, 
 Rich Summers, 2001-04 
 Devin Nelson, 2002-2005
 C. Ryan Osorio, 2004-05 
 Justin Leavitt 2005–07
 Andrew Syndergaard 2005–09
 Stephen Jones ca. 2010
 Josh Drean, 2008–2011
 Matt McClure, 2012–2015
 Charlie Bird, 2015–2018
 Grant Taylor, 2016-2020
 Stephan Millard, 2017-2020

See also
 List of U.S. college mascots

Gallery

References

External links

 
Photographs of Cosmo the Cougar from the L. Tom Perry Special Collections, Harold B. Lee Library, Brigham Young University

1953 establishments in Utah
Fictional mountain lions
Lion mascots
College mascots in the United States
BYU Cougars
Mascots introduced in 1953